Tuakau railway station was a railway station (now closed) in the town of Tuakau in the Waikato District of New Zealand.

The station was on the North Island Main Trunk line, and opened on 20 May 1875. Originally it was called Tuakau Road.

The station was rebuilt in 1910, opening on 10 September 1911, and closed to passengers on 14 March 1983. The station closed on 2 March 1986.

The station was on the route of the former Waikato Connection, although it did not stop at Tuakau. The Hamilton-Auckland passenger service is to resume as Te Huia in 2020; and as the new service may stop at Tuakau, in 2018 the District Council allocated money for reopening the station. In 2020 reopening of the platform was put forward as a COVID-19 recovery scheme, at an estimated cost of $15m.

History 

Trains had been able to reach Tuakau since at least February 1875. Tuakau wasn't shown in the 1875 timetable, but was in that of 1876. There was a stationmaster by June 1876 and fencing of the stationmaster's house was mentioned in September 1878.

From 1887 to 1911 a Post Office was run by railway staff. The station was rebuilt in 1910, opening on 10 September 1911, From 1913 it was moved away from the station. A state house was added in 1956.

The stockyards were sold in 1974 and Tuakau closed to passengers and all goods traffic, except in wagon lots, on 14 March 1983. By then there was an island platform, station building, footbridge, low-level loading bank, fitter's shed and New Zealand Co-op Dairy Co's siding at the north end. The station closed on 2 March 1986.

Passenger numbers reached a peak during the Second World War, as shown in the graph and table below.

References

External links 

 Photos of station in 1910, during rebuilding 1 2
1910 photo of line near Tuakau being straightened

Defunct railway stations in New Zealand
Buildings and structures in Waikato
Rail transport in Waikato
Railway stations opened in 1875
Railway stations closed in 1986